"I'm Not Ready" is the first single released from Michael Bolton's twenty-first studio album, Gems. It features Australian singer-songwriter Delta Goodrem on vocals. The song was released on iTunes on 16 May 2011 and peaked at number 29 on the US Adult Contemporary chart. Goodrem's original solo recording was released on her fourth studio album, Child of the Universe, the following year.

Background
Goodrem wrote the song about her recent split from fiancé Brian McFadden. Lyrics include "I’m scared of tomorrow and the emptiness to come, but I’ve changed for the better since I’ve known your love."

Bolton got a call from his label and was introduced to Goodrem. Goodrem played the song to Bolton who requested this song be included on his near complete album to which Goodrem agreed.

Promotion
Bolton and Goodrem performed the song live on Dancing With The Stars (US) on May 10  and again on NBC's Today Show on June 20.

Reception
Brendon Veevers of Renowned for Sound said the song is “both sentimental and vulnerable” and is 'harmony heaven' as the pair pass vocals from one another with ease.

Simon Gage of the Daily Express simply called the song “beautiful”.

Chart performance

References

2011 singles
Michael Bolton songs
Delta Goodrem songs
Songs written by Delta Goodrem
Songs written by Vince Pizzinga
2011 songs